This is a list of Members of Parliament elected in the 1958 Northern Ireland general election.

All members of the Northern Ireland House of Commons elected at the 1958 Northern Ireland general election are listed.

Members

 Edward George Richardson elected as an Independent Nationalist, but joined the Nationalist Party on election.

Changes
1958: Edward George Richardson joins the Nationalist Party grouping.
5 March 1959: David John Little elected for the Ulster Unionists in West Down, following the death of John Edgar Bailey.
28 May 1959: William James Morgan elected for the Ulster Unionists in Belfast Clifton, following the resignation of Robin Kinahan.
5 February 1960: William Craig elected for the Ulster Unionists in Larne, following the resignation of Walter Topping.
16 February 1960: Desmond Boal elected for the Ulster Unionists in Belfast Shankill, following the resignation of Henry Holmes.
9 July 1960: James Chichester-Clark elected for the Ulster Unionists in South Londonderry, following the resignation of Dehra Parker.
29 November 1960: Joseph Burns elected for the Ulster Unionists in North Londonderry, following the death of Robert Moore.
20 April 1961: Walter Scott elected for the Ulster Unionists in Belfast Bloomfield, following the resignation of Daniel Dixon.
22 November 1961: Sheelagh Murnaghan elected for the Ulster Liberal Party for Queen's University, following the death of Samuel Irwin.
2 March 1962: Death of William May, MP for Ards.  This position remained unfilled at the time of the general election.

References
Biographies of Members of the Northern Ireland House of Commons

1958